Aleksandr Ivanovich Khalzov (born February 26, 1965) is a retired Russian professional footballer.

Club career
He made his Russian Football National League debut for FC Metallurg Lipetsk on 23 September 1993 in a game against FC Tekstilshchik Ivanovo. He played 2 seasons in the FNL for Metallurg.

Honours
 Russian Third League Zone 5 top scorer: 1996 (25 goals).

External links
 

1965 births
Footballers from Tambov
Living people
Soviet footballers
Russian footballers
FC Spartak Tambov players
FC FShM Torpedo Moscow players
FC Spartak Kostroma players
FC Metallurg Lipetsk players
BFC Siófok players
FC Ilves players
Veikkausliiga players
Russian expatriate footballers
Expatriate footballers in Hungary
Expatriate footballers in Finland
Russian expatriate sportspeople in Hungary
Russian expatriate sportspeople in Finland
Association football forwards
Association football defenders
Nemzeti Bajnokság I players